Igreja do Colégio, Portuguese for "church of the college", may refer to:

 Igreja de São João Evangelista, church in Funchal, Portugal
 Church of the Jesuit College (Ponta Delgada), church in Ponta Delgada, Portugal